Helen Wadsworth (born 7 April 1964) is a former Welsh professional golfer on the Ladies European Tour.

Career
Prior to turning professional, Wadsworth was runner-up in the 1990 Welsh Ladies' Amateur Championship, runner-up to Julie Wade in the 1990 British Ladies Amateur, won the 1990 World Fourball Championship (with Julie Wade) in Brazil, and was a member of the 1990 Great Britain and Ireland Curtis Cup team. She played collegiate golf with the Wake Forest Demon Deacons.

In her first year as a professional, Wadsworth had three top-10 finishes, winning her the Ladies European Tour Rookie of the Year Award. In 1994, she won the BMW European Masters and took second place at the Irish Open. In 1996 she placed second at the McDonald's WPGA Championship of Europe at Gleneagles and in 1997 she won the Sunningdale Foursomes. She won the Taiwan Ladies Open in 1998.

In 2002, she was voted to a position on the Atlantic Coast Conference's 50th anniversary golf team.

Professional wins (3)

Ladies European Tour wins (1)

Ladies Asian Golf Tour wins (1)

Source:

Other wins (1)
1997 Sunningdale Foursomes (with Julie Hall)

Team appearances
Amateur
European Ladies' Team Championship (representing Wales): 1987, 1989
Curtis Cup (representing Great Britain & Ireland): 1990

References

Welsh female golfers
Wake Forest Demon Deacons women's golfers
Ladies European Tour golfers
1964 births
Living people